Shadow Ridge High School may refer to:

Shadow Ridge High School (Arizona)
Shadow Ridge High School (Nevada)